Jigit (also spelled as Dzhigit, yigit, zhigit or igid) is a word used in the North Caucasus and Central Asia to describe a skillful and brave equestrian, or a brave person in general. The word is of Turkic origin.

The derived term 'jigitovka' (or jigiting) means the special style of trick riding, which originated in the Turkic cultures of Caucasus and Central Asia, and is also popular with Cossacks, who adopted it from the Circassians. When performing dzhigitovka, the riders at full gallop stand up, jump to the ground and back to the saddle, pick up objects from the ground (such as coins, hats, etc.), shoot targets with various weapons, ride hanging on the side or under the belly of the horse and do other acrobatic feats.

Since the early 19th century jigitovka has been demonstrated in the circuses and horse sport competitions, and made its way to the popular Western culture, for instance Cossacks (actually Georgian horsemen from western part of Georgia, Guria) demonstrated jigitovka as part of Buffalo Bill's Wild West Show. Jigitovka was also used in training of cavalry forces in the Russian Empire and USSR. Modern jigitovka as a circus performance includes complex stunts usually performed by a group of riders.

Equestrian Jigitovka 
 
In 2016 jigitovka was officially recognised as a sporting discipline in the Russian Federation.

References

External links
 Russia dzhigitovka
 Horse Training. History, training dzhigitovka Russia 
 Georgian Trick Riders in American Wild West Shows, 1890s-1920s by Irakli Makharadze, Publisher: McFarland 
 Official 2017 Equestrian Dzhigitovka Rules in Russian
 Russian News Report on 2017 Equestrian Dzhigitovka World Championship

Mounted games
Turkmenistan culture
Turkic culture